Barbaetis is a genus of mayflies in the family Baetidae.

References

Mayflies
Mayfly genera
Insects of Europe